The flag of The Hague was on established on December 2, 1920 by a decision of the municipal government of The Hague. In 1920, it was decided that the flag would consist of two equal stripes of green and yellow. On March 28, 1949 the colors were modified. The order of the colors was reversed and the hue of the green stripe was changed.

Unofficial first flag 

In 1857, the mayor of The Hague announced to the Minister of Interior that the colors of the flag would be black and yellow, equal to the color of the Coat of arms of The Hague. This flag has however never been officially established.

Usage 

The football club ADO Den Haag uses a rotated version of the flag in their logo. The logo of The Hague uses the colors of the flag since 2013.

See also 
 Coat of arms of The Hague

References

Sources 
 

The Hague
The Hague
The Hague
Culture in The Hague
History of The Hague
The Hague